Sidney Rittenberg (August 14, 1921 – August 24, 2019) was an American journalist, scholar, and Chinese linguist who lived in China from 1944 to 1980. He worked closely with Mao Zedong, Zhu De,  Zhou Enlai, and other leaders of the Chinese Communist Party (CCP) during the Chinese Communist Revolution, and was with these central Communist leaders at Yan'an. Later, he was imprisoned in solitary confinement, twice. In his book "The Man Who Stayed Behind", Rittenberg stated that he was the second American citizen to join the CCP, the first being the Lebanese-American Doctor Ma Haide (born Shafick George Hatem.)

Early life
Rittenberg was born into a Jewish family in Charleston, South Carolina and he lived there until his college studies. He was the son of Muriel (Sluth) and Sidney Rittenberg, who was president of the Charleston City Council. After attending Porter Military Academy, he turned down a full scholarship to Princeton University and instead attended the University of North Carolina at Chapel Hill, where he majored in philosophy. While attending Chapel Hill, he became a member of the Dialectic Society and the US Communist Party. When he arrived in China, he was sent to bring a $26 check to the family of a girl who was killed by a drunken US soldier. Despite the family's devastation, they gave Rittenberg $6 for his help. It was at that point that "something inside Sidney Rittenberg shifted."

Interpreting for Mao
Rittenberg befriended the communist leader in the Yan'an caves, which resulted in a lasting relationship with Mao until early days of the Cultural Revolution. He later worked for the Xinhua News Agency and Central Broadcast Administration.

First imprisonment
In 1949, immediately before the formal surrender of Beijing to the Communists, Rittenberg said he was summoned to the capital and he went, expecting to play a role in promoting the Communist takeover to the rest of the world. In fact Rittenberg was arrested and placed in solitary confinement, because Stalin had denounced him as a US spy. Rittenberg attributes his survival in solitary confinement to a poem by Edwin Markham:

They drew a circle that shut me out
Heretic, rebel, a thing to floutBut love and I had the wit to win;We drew a circle that took them in. Cultural Revolution 
On his release in 1955 Rittenberg remained a strong supporter of Mao and actively and enthusiastically supported the Great Leap Forward. Later he was a supporter of the Cultural Revolution and briefly associated with Mao's inner circle, leading a group of rebels to take over the state broadcasting institution. On April 8, 1967, the People's Daily'' published a long article written by him.

Rittenberg said, though, that after he objected to the excesses of the period he was arrested and placed back in solitary confinement, from 1967 to 1977. On his release he emigrated to the United States.

Career as business advisor 
In the United States after his release, he used his extensive knowledge and contacts in China to build his own capitalist empire, advising corporate leaders, including Bill Gates of Microsoft and the computer magnate Michael S. Dell, on how to cash in on China’s vast growing economy. Still welcome in China, he took entrepreneurs on guided tours, introducing them to the country’s movers and shakers.

See also
Anna Louise Strong
Jean Pasqualini
Edgar Snow
Sidney Shapiro

References

Citations

Sources 

Bringing Chinese History to life: Professor Sidney Rittenberg honored for commitment to building peace
Rittenberg @Asia Society 
"China's Cultural Revolution, A Turning Point in History"
文章内容
Strategic News Service - Future in Review 2004

Further reading


External links
Video interview with Sidney Rittenberg
Website for feature documentary on Sidney Rittenberg's life in China
Interview from 2015

1921 births
2019 deaths
Writers from Charleston, South Carolina
University of North Carolina at Chapel Hill alumni
Jewish American writers
Jewish socialists
American communists
American Marxists
People of the Cultural Revolution
Jewish Chinese history
American expatriates in China
Pacific Lutheran University faculty
Prisoners and detainees of the People's Republic of China
People from Fox Island, Washington